MS Europa 2 is a cruise ship operated by Hapag-Lloyd Cruises, a German-based cruise line. She entered service in May 2013.

Concept and construction
Europa 2 was built at the STX Europe shipyard at St-Nazaire, France. Her first steel was cut on 5 September 2011, the keel was laid on 1 March 2012 and she was launched on 6 July 2012. On 29 April 2013, the vessel was handed over to Hapag Lloyd, with Wolfgang Flägel, managing director of Hapag-Lloyd Cruises and Laurent Castaing, general manager of STX France, signing the takeover protocol. She was christened on 10 May 2013, during the 824th Hamburg Port anniversary.

Public areas
She has the greatest space per passenger of any cruise ship, with contemporary decor.

The art collection aboard Europa 2 is one of the largest at sea, with 890 originals commissioned exclusively for the vessel. The collection's focus is on contemporary pieces; it includes works by Ólafur Elíasson, David Hockney, Damien Hirst, Adam Fuss and Hans Hartung.

Facilities

Europa 2 has 251 passenger cabins, seven restaurants and six bars, a  pool, a gym, a spa and two golf simulators.

Service history
Europa 2's 14-night maiden voyage departed from Hamburg, Germany, and stopped at Amsterdam, Antwerp, Honfleur, La Rochelle, Bordeaux, Bilbao, Leixões and Lisbon. The vessel has since been named the number-one cruise ship in the world by the Berlitz Guide to Cruising & Cruise Ships, replacing her fleetmate, which had held that distinction for more than a decade.

See also

 List of cruise ships

References

External links

Official website
Christening of the MS Europa 2

Cruise ships
2012 ships
Ships built in France